MoreVC, formerly known as Israel Cleantech Ventures, is an Israel specialized venture capital firm founded in 2006 by Glen Schwaber, Jack Levy, and Meir Ukeles.  It was the first Israel-focused clean technology venture capital fund intent on providing growth capital to Israel's energy, water and environmental technology sectors.  It raised $75 million for its first fund in 2007 from investors that included Robeco and Piper Jaffray, as well as institutional investors and family offices.

In February 2020, it expanded its ventures into clean technology and rebranded to MoveVC.

Portfolio companies
Aqwise — Working on increased treatment capacity and nitrogen removal in wastewater treatment plants.
BrightView Systems — Develops and brings to market process and production optimization technologies for the thin-film photovoltaic industry.
CellEra — Working on disruptive low-temperature fuel cell technology.
CRE (Citrine Renewable Energy) — Developing systems converting biogas into high value biomethane.
Emefcy — Utilizing microbial fuel cell (MFC) technology to produce electricity from the treatment of wastewater.
FRX Polymers — Developed and is commercializing a family of novel non-halogenated, transparent, high melt flowing, fire-resistant plastics.
Gro Intelligence — Deciphers data through computational and visualization tools that enable global food security.
Metrolight — Has established products on electronic ballast solutions for HID lighting systems. 
Pythagoras Solar — Works with photovoltaic technology and builds "Medium" concentration solar cells using silicon.
Scodix — Provides Digital Enhancement Presses for the printing industry
Tigo Energy — Works on hardware and software improving power output efficiency, management and control to photovoltaic solar installations
Vayyar - Develops intelligent radar sensors for 3D imaging

References

External links

  (old)

Financial services companies established in 2006
Venture capital firms of Israel
Solar power in Israel